The 2008 GCC U-23 Championship took place in Riyadh, Saudi Arabia for the first time. Five nations took part. The competition was held in Riyadh from 6 to 17 January. Saudi Arabia won the title after defeating Bahrain 1–0 on the final matchday.

Venues

Teams

{| class="wikitable sortable"
|-
! Team
! data-sort-type="number"|Previous appearances in tournament
|-
|  || 0 (debut)
|-
|  || 0 (debut)
|-
|   || 0 (debut)
|-
|   || 0 (debut)
|-
|  (host) || 0 (debut)
|}

Tournament 
The teams played a single round-robin style competition. The team achieving first place in the overall standings was the tournament winner.

All times are local, AST (UTC+3).

Matches

Statistics

Goalscorers

Awards
Player of the Tournament
 Hamid Ismail
Golden Boot
 Hamid Ismail
Golden Glove
 Waleed Abdullah

See also 
Arabian Gulf Cup
Arab Gulf Cup Football Federation

References

External links
GCC U-23 Championship at Goalzz

GCC U-23 Championship
2008
2008 in Asian football
2007–08 in Saudi Arabian football
2007–08 in Bahraini football
2007–08 in Omani football
2007–08 in Kuwaiti football
2007–08 in Qatari football
2008 in youth association football